Yu-Chuan Jack Li is the founder of Biomedical Informatics education and research institute. 

He later became the founding dean of a new College of Medical Science and Technology at Taipei Medical University(TMU) in 2011, which composed of the original Department of Biomedical Informatics, the Department of Medical Laboratory Science and Biotechnology, the Department of Cancer Biology and Drug Discovery, the Department of Medical Neuroscience and the Department of Translational Science. Li also founded the International Center for Health Information Technology at TMU in 2015 to foster global awareness and international collaboration in healthcare. He has been the principal investigator of many national projects related to translational Biomedical Informatics, Patient Safety, and Artificial Intelligence.

His contributions to the field have been recognized with his election as a Fellow of the Australian College of Health Informatics in 2009, the American College of Medical Informatics in 2010, and the International Academy of Health Science Informatics in 2017.

References

1966 births
Living people
Scientists from Taipei
Academic staff of Taipei Medical University
Taipei Medical University alumni
University of Utah School of Medicine alumni
Taiwanese dermatologists
Taiwanese medical researchers
Taiwanese university and college faculty deans